Paul Mwazha (born 25 October 1918) is a Zimbabwean clergyman known as Mutumwa by his followers. Mutumwa means “angelic messenger” in the Shona language.

Early life 
A DailyNews report stated that Mwazha is the leader of the African Apostolic Church and that he was born on October 25,1918. The Herald newspaper further notes that he was born at Holy Cross Mission, Chirumanzu District, near the small town of Mvuma, in the Midlands Province of Zimbabwe.

Personal life 

It is stated that Mwazha was initially named Mamvura upon his birth by his mother Saramina but was later renamed Paul based on the catholic tradition of naming newly baptised children by giving them a saint's name. It is believed that he was baptised by Father Schmidt, a German Roman Catholic missionary. Soon after his baptism, Pindula notes that Paul became seriously ill with a highly contagious disease, influenza, and he was believed to have subsequently died. This prompted his mother to rush him for baptism as well as the last rites at the altar in the church before burial. Immediately after his baptism, and to the amazement of everyone in the room, it is stated by the Sunday Mail, Paul is believed to have sprung back to life immediately. It is said that Father Schmidt and the gathered congregation were all filled with the Holy Spirit and they all uttered in Shona language saying, 'Mwana amutsirwe basa, mwana amutsirwe basa, mwana amutsirwe basa', loosely translated to English as, 'The child has been raised for a mission'. His followers, who are mainly members of The African Apostolic Church adore him to such an extent that they prominently mention his name during their prayers. Paul is believed to have learnt and started the Roman Catholic Catechism classes at the age of 11.

Mission 

As the priest, Mwazha formed the African Apostolic Church in the year 1959. His church is believed to command a mass following of over 7 million congregants. Prior to the formation of The African Apostolic Church, Paul was previously a teacher within the Methodist Church in Southern Rhodesia. Members of his church have a distinct dress-code in which they wear spotless white garments during the Sabbath days. On any other days, the congregates wear pastel coloured clothes with no colour embellishments. Paul Mwazha has lived to see a fourth generation of his family. His wife, Joyce Makaonesu Mwazha died aged 79 in April 2017. She succumbed after a long battle with diabetes. Some of Mwazha's sons are members of the church he founded (The African Apostolic Church), and all of them are bishops and part of the church's top leadership. He is often called NHUME by the devotees of the African Apostolic church meaning God's messenger. It is noted  by The Manica Post that they call him NHUME/Mutumwa because it is believed that Paul Mwazha appears prominently in their dreams fighting their battles spiritually and that he has performed miracles which changed their lives for the better. Mwazha has been consulted by elders in Zimbabwe to pray for a community which had suffered from a wave of murders. The Herald notes that he has maintained a modest personal life; for almost 56 years, Paul has not trimmed his beard, a vow he took when he founded the church. Zimbabwe's main opposition leader, Nelson Chamisa, paid a visit to Mwazha's homestead in Harare to congratulate Paul on reaching 101 years on 25 October 2019.

References 

1918 births
Living people
Zimbabwean centenarians
Men centenarians
Zimbabwean Christian religious leaders
People from Midlands Province